Lake Yastrebinoye (lit. Hawk Lake) is a 2 km long lake in Priozersky District of Leningrad Oblast, close to the border with the Republic of Karelia, in the northernmost part of the Karelian Isthmus, 10 km from the railway station Kuznechnoye. The lake is situated in a depression between steep outcrops of granite rocks of the Baltic Shield, which are a popular climbing area. The lake and its surroundings (including Lake Pestovo) are designated as a protected natural monument of Leningrad Oblast.

In 2006 licenses were issued by Karelian authorities to establish granite quarries in the Republic of Karelia next to the natural monument, which is situated nearby, but in another federal subject. After a public campaign against the project and petitioning by the government of Leningrad Oblast in 2007 the licenses were withdrawn and the 10 km zone along the border in Karelia near the lake was reserved as a protected area.

Karelian Isthmus
Lakes of Leningrad Oblast
LYastrebinoye
Protected areas of Russia